Lauderdale County Courthouse may refer to:

Lauderdale County Courthouse (Mississippi), Meridian, Mississippi, a Mississippi Landmark
Lauderdale County Courthouse (Tennessee), Ripley, Tennessee